The 1947 Fort Lauderdale hurricane was a long-lived and an intense tropical cyclone that affected the Bahamas, southernmost Florida, and the Gulf Coast of the United States in September 1947. The fourth Atlantic tropical cyclone of the year, it formed in the eastern Atlantic Ocean on September 4, becoming a hurricane, the third of the 1947 Atlantic hurricane season, less than a day later. After moving south by west for the next four days, it turned to the northwest and rapidly attained strength beginning on September 9. In spite of contemporaneous forecasts that predicted a strike farther north, the storm then turned to the west and poised to strike South Florida, crossing first the northern Bahamas at peak intensity. In the Bahamas, the storm produced a large storm surge and heavy damage, but with no reported fatalities.

A day later, the storm struck South Florida as a Category 4 hurricane, its eye becoming the first and only of a major hurricane to strike Fort Lauderdale. In Florida, advance warnings and stringent building codes were credited with minimizing structural damage and reducing loss of life to 17 people, but nevertheless widespread flooding and coastal damage resulted from heavy rainfall and high tides. Many vegetable plantings, citrus groves, and cattle were submerged or drowned as the storm exacerbated already high water levels and briefly threatened to breach the dikes surrounding Lake Okeechobee. However, the dikes held firm, and evacuations were otherwise credited with minimizing the potential death toll. On the west coast of the state, the storm caused further flooding, extensive damage south of the Tampa Bay Area, and the loss of a ship at sea.

On September 18, the hurricane entered the Gulf of Mexico and threatened the Florida Panhandle, but later its track moved farther west than expected, ultimately leading to a landfall southeast of New Orleans, Louisiana. The storm was the first major hurricane to test Greater New Orleans since 1915, and the widespread flooding that resulted spurred flood-protection legislation and an enlarged levee system to safeguard the flood-prone area. In all, the powerful storm killed 51 people and caused $110 million (1947 US$) in damage.

Meteorological history

Hurricane Four was first monitored as an area of low pressure over French West Africa on September 2, 1947. Steadily tracking westward, the system was quickly classified as a depression before moving into the Atlantic Ocean near Dakar, Senegal, on September 4. Shortly thereafter, weather agencies lost track of the system over water due to a lack of ships in the region. Another few days later, the cyclone began to intensify more rapidly as its forward speed increased; between September 10 and 15, reconnaissance missions by the United States Navy began monitoring the hurricane. The same mission reported a double eyewall, a feature replaced by a large eye by the time the storm hit the Bahamas and Florida. The next day, the storm attained the minimum pressure, 938 mb (27.70 inHg), recorded by aircraft reconnaissance during its life span, peaking in intensity as a strong Category 4 hurricane. On September 15, however, the storm lost this intensity. Following the phonetic alphabet from World War II, the U.S. Weather Bureau office in Miami, Florida, which then worked in conjunction with the military, named the storm George, though such names were apparently informal and did not appear in public advisories until 1950, when the first Atlantic storm to be so designated was Hurricane Fox.

Until 2014, the cyclone was classified as a Category 5 hurricane in the northern Bahamas, based largely upon the observation from Elbow Cay; however, this wind was eventually determined to be unrepresentative of the intensity. (Visual estimates of wind speed, particularly early in the era of modern reconnaissance, were sometimes unreliable.) About 24 hours later on September 17, it made landfall near Fort Lauderdale, Florida, as a Category 4 hurricane with maximum sustained winds near . To this date, the hurricane remains the only major hurricane to have struck Broward County, Florida, at that strength, and the only one to pass directly over the county seat of Fort Lauderdale, though the 1926 Miami hurricane and Hurricane King caused significant damage in the county. The station also reported a pressure of 947.2 mb (27.97 inHg), the lowest during the passage of the storm over Florida, though Fort Lauderdale, in the eye to the south, reported higher pressures; winds at the lighthouse briefly lulled as the center passed nearby, while Fort Lauderdale reported a one-hour lull. Unusually, the lowest pressures occurred not in the center of the eye, but near its northern edge, suggesting the influence of eyewall mesovortices. The hurricane moved slowly inland near , and it diminished to a Category 2 hurricane over the Everglades.

On September 20, the storm rapidly weakened to a tropical depression over northeastern Texas, but the remnant circulation turned northeast over southeastern Oklahoma and northwest Arkansas. On September 21, it dissipated over southern Missouri.

Preparations
On the evening of September 15, the U.S. Weather Bureau expected the storm to recurve, precipitating a possible landfall between
Jacksonville, Florida, and Savannah, Georgia. As a precautionary measure, small watercraft between Jupiter, Florida, and Cape Hatteras, North Carolina, were advised to remain in port. Early on September 16, the forecast was revised, and hurricane warnings were issued for the Florida east coast from Titusville to Fort Lauderdale, later to be expanded to Miami. As the hurricane approached Northern commercial flights were grounded, and 1,500 National Guard troops were readied for mobilization if "deemed necessary" by Florida Governor Millard Caldwell. 4,700 persons in Broward County moved into shelters established by the Red Cross, while up to 15,000 people evacuated the flood-prone Lake Okeechobee region. In all, more than 40,000 people statewide moved into shelters established by the Red Cross. Military aircraft were flown to safer locations, in some cases four days or more in advance. Hotels in the threatened area filled quickly due to fears of a disaster similar to the 1928 Okeechobee hurricane; at Melbourne and Cocoa no vacant hotels were left for evacuees. During the storm, the MacArthur, North Bay (now Kennedy), and Venetian Causeways in Miami were closed to traffic. At Lake Worth alone, 1,800 people sheltered in nine official shelters during the storm.

As the hurricane entered the Gulf of Mexico, initial forecasts expected the storm to strike between Apalachicola and Pensacola, Florida, but by 0415 UTC on September 19, hurricane warnings were issued by the Weather Bureau office in New Orleans covering Saint Marks, Florida, to Morgan City, Louisiana. As the storm neared Louisiana, Emile Verret, the acting governor of Baton Rouge, closed the state capital and sent public officials home. In New Orleans, local National Guard units were mobilized.

Impact

The Bahamas
Strong winds damaged or destroyed many homes and docks on the western end of Grand Bahama. At Settlement Point, a storm surge of  destroyed half the community, preventing medical supplies from being delivered until September 20. Despite its intensity, the storm was not attributed to any known deaths in The Bahamas.

Florida

The storm killed only 17 people in Florida, many fewer than the size and intensity of the storm suggested, largely due to improved warnings and preparations, as well as more stringent construction standards, since the 1920s. The hurricane was not only intense and slow-moving, but also unusually large: some reports indicated winds of hurricane force extended  from the center in all directions. In spite of the winds, wind-caused structural damage was generally minor; in Broward County only 37 homes were irreparably destroyed, primarily small homes or those undermined by coastal waves, while in the Palm Beach area most of the unroofed buildings were small and cheaply built; most newer structures, built since the 1928 Okeechobee hurricane, resulted in less damage in the September 1947 storm.

Intense wind gusts unroofed hundreds of homes and apartments in the Hollywood–Fort Lauderdale area, and reportedly "few utility poles were left standing, many having been snapped like toothpicks by the  gusts." At the Boca Raton Army Air Field, the hurricane destroyed 150 barracks, supply houses, warehouses, the post stockade, the fire station, and the theater and mess buildings. Losses as lately reported were 1947 US$4,500,000, hastening existing plans to close the base. At West Palm Beach, 40% of the initial 1947 US$1,500,000 in damages was related to roof damage. Farther south, the 11,000-seat Hialeah race track was mostly unroofed, with barns and paddocks damaged and many of its famed flamingos missing.

On the east coast of Florida, many cities experienced significant flooding; tides of up to  affected Broward and Palm Beach counties, washing out large portions of State Highway A1A between Palm Beach and Boynton Beach, as well as between Sunny Isles Beach and Haulover. At Miami Beach many of the 334 resort hotels as well as homes and apartments were battered by waves. There, a three-to-four-ft-deep (0.9-to-1.2-m) layer of sand covered many oceanfront grounds, and nearby neighborhoods on the Venetian Islands, like Belle Isle, were flooded to a depth of several feet. In Miami, the city manager claimed  of city streets were flooded out, while in Miami Springs half the homes were flooded. The town of Davie, having lost 35,000 citrus trees to floodwaters in preceding months, suffered devastating losses to groves and vegetable beds.

On Lake Okeechobee, concerns about disastrous flooding were heightened by memories of the 1928 Okeechobee hurricane on the south shore and of the 1926 Miami hurricane at Moore Haven. However, due to revamped improvements in the dike, the storm caused only minor damage, and the dike prevented a repeat of the flooding of 1926 and 1928, in which over 2,500 people drowned. Nevertheless, floodwaters in the Everglades region resulted in significant losses to cattle, and hundreds of small block homes in the agricultural districts were blown off their foundations. Much of the marshy country was waterlogged during and after the storm.

However, the Tampa Bay area, being north of the eye, had less damage due to offshore winds forcing tides below normal. In Fort Myers, hundreds of trees were prostrated and the city left without power. During the storm, two vessels, with a total combined crew of nine people, went missing; as of September 18, contact had been established with the former and the crew declared safe, but the remaining vessel, with a crew of two, had not been accounted for. Additionally, six Cuban schooners carrying 150 crew members in all sheltered off Anclote Key late on September 17 and rode out the storm. However, another Cuban vessel, the Antonio Cerdedo, foundered and sank off Fort Myers with a loss of seven of its crew members.

Gulf Coast of the United States
Due to the increasing northerly winds, water overtopped sections of the levees on Lake Pontchartrain, leaving some lakefront streets submerged "waist deep," above the 3-ft (0.92-m) delimiter. As communications failed during the calm eye, the Weather Bureau office in Fort Worth, Texas, assumed the duties of the New Orleans office by broadcasting advisories to the public. During the eye, atmospheric pressure in New Orleans dropped as low as 968.9 mb (28.61 inHg) by 1649 UTC.

Large portions of Jefferson Parish remained flooded for as long as two weeks. Saint Bernard and Plaquemines parishes were also inundated by an 11-ft (3.4-m) storm surge, though mainly sparsely populated areas were affected.

Although the storm had weakened by its second landfall, the hydrology of the region makes it particularly vulnerable to hurricanes. 12 people were killed in Louisiana and 22 in Mississippi. In both states combined, the Red Cross reported that the storm destroyed 1,647 homes and damaged 25,000 others, with the majority, up to 90%, of the destroyed having been due to water. In New Orleans, the storm produced an estimated 1947 USD$100,000,000 worth of damage to the city.

Aftermath
In Florida, a federal state of emergency was declared by then-U.S. President Harry S. Truman. The combined flooding from the September hurricane and a later hurricane in October was among the worst in southern Florida's history, even spurring the creation of the Central and Southern Florida Flood Control District along with a plan for new flood-control levees and canals. In New Orleans, the United States Congress approved the Lake Pontchartrain and Vicinity Project to assist ongoing efforts to increase the height of the existing levee along the lakeshore; to bolster the existing seawall in Orleans Parish, an 8-ft-high (2.4-m) levee was erected along lakeside Jefferson Parish.

The storm is most commonly called the 1947 Fort Lauderdale hurricane but is sometimes referred to as Hurricane George, the 1947 New Orleans hurricane, or the 1947 Pompano Beach (or Broward) hurricane. If this same storm were to hit today it would probably do around $11.72 billion (2004 US$) in damages.

See also

 List of Category 4 Atlantic hurricanes
 List of Florida hurricanes (1900–1949)
 Hurricane Jeanne (2004) – A Category 3 hurricane that caused major damage when it made landfall in Central Florida

Notes

References

Bibliography

External links
 The Times-Picayune in 175 years – 1947: New Orleans, Metairie flooded by hurricane
 UNISYS tracks for 1947 storms
 Pictures from Lake Okeechobee area after the storm

F (1947)
1947 Fort Lauderdale
Category 4 Atlantic hurricanes
Hurricanes in the Bahamas
Hurricanes in Florida
Hurricanes in Mississippi
Hurricanes in Louisiana
Fort Lauderdale Hurricane, 1947
Fort Lauderdale Hurricane, 1947
Hurricanes in Arkansas
Fort Lauderdale hurricane